ELO's Greatest Hits is a compilation by the Electric Light Orchestra (ELO), released in 1979. Despite being released after the album Discovery, this album omitted the band's most recent hits, "Don't Bring Me Down" and "Shine a Little Love".

The album sleeve art features a letter written by the band's co-founder and leader, Jeff Lynne, describing the '73–'78 period and the recording of each of the songs.

Track listing 
All tracks written by Jeff Lynne.

Side one

Side two

Personnel
 Jeff Lynne – vocals, guitars
 Bev Bevan – drums, percussion
 Richard Tandy – keyboards
 Mike de Albuquerque – bass (to 1974)
 Kelly Groucutt – bass, vocals (1974 onwards)
 Mik Kaminski – violin
 Mike Edwards – cello (to 1974)
 Melvyn Gale – cello (1975 onwards)
 Hugh McDowell – cello
 Wilfred Gibson – violin on "Showdown" and "Ma-Ma-Ma Belle"
 Colin Walker – cello on "Showdown" and "Ma-Ma-Ma Belle"
 Marc Bolan – guitar on "Ma-Ma-Ma Belle"

Chart performance

 1 Australia
 2 New Zealand
 6 Canada
 7 United Kingdom
 13 Norway
 17 Austria
 28 Spain
 30 United States (CashBox & Billboard 200)

Certifications

References

1979 greatest hits albums
Albums produced by Jeff Lynne
Electric Light Orchestra compilation albums
Epic Records compilation albums